Kara Jane Chesworth (née Francis; born 4 January 1972 in Portsmouth, England) is an English-born Welsh racing cyclist. She represented Wales at the 2010 Commonwealth Games.

Chesworth took up cycling in 2005 in order to get fit, and first competed in a circuit race in Tywyn in 2007. She placed 8th in the 2010 British Women's road race championships, and won the British women's road race series.

Palmarès

2007
1st  Welsh National Circuit Race Championships

2008
1st  Welsh National Circuit Race Championships

2009
1st  Welsh National Circuit Race Championships

2010
1st British Women's Road Series
2nd Welsh National Road Race Championships

References

1972 births
Living people
Sportspeople from Portsmouth
Welsh female cyclists
Cyclists at the 2010 Commonwealth Games
Commonwealth Games competitors for Wales